Muhammad Imran is a Bangladeshi diplomat and the Ambassador of Bangladesh to the United States. Prior to join here, he was the High Commissioner of Bangladesh to India.

Early life 
Imran has completed his MBBS from Mymensingh Medical College under the University of Dhaka in 1983. He received further training from Bangladesh Public Administration Training Centre and the Foreign Service Academy in 1989 and 1991.

Career 

Imran joined the Bangladesh Civil Service in 1986 as part of the Foreign Service. Imran worked in the Bangladesh High Commission in the late 1990s as a counsellor.

From 2008 to 2010, Imran worked as a Director General at the Ministry of Foreign Affairs. Imran served as the Ambassador of Bangladesh to Uzbekistan from 2010 to 2013.

Imran served as the Ambassador of Bangladesh to the United Arab Emirates till 2019. On 12 November 2019, he was appointed the High Commissioner of Bangladesh to India. On 21 January 2021, he presented his credentials to the President of India, Ram Nath Kovind. He met the Governor of Assam, Jagdish Mukhi, to discuss bilateral ties.

References 

20th-century Bengalis
21st-century Bengalis
High Commissioners of Bangladesh to India
University of Dhaka alumni
Ambassadors of Bangladesh to the United Arab Emirates
Ambassadors of Bangladesh to Uzbekistan
Ambassadors of Bangladesh to the United States
Bangladeshi diplomats